Manuela Carmona (1770-1827) was Spanish stage actor.

She was engaged at the Teatro de la Cruz in 1805, served as the theater manager in 1811–1816.

References

 Gómez García, Manuel (1998). Diccionario Akal de Teatro. Ediciones Akal. ISBN 9788446008279.

1770 births
1827 deaths
19th-century Spanish actresses
19th-century theatre managers
18th-century Spanish actresses